Tismăneanu is a Romanian surname. Notable people with the surname include:

 Leonte Tismăneanu (1913–1981), Romanian communist activist
 Vladimir Tismăneanu (born 1951), Romanian-American political scientist and sociologist

Romanian-language surnames